Londy Waleska Barrios Castañeda (born 8 April 1992) is a Guatemalan footballer who plays as a centre back and a midfielder. She has been a member of the Guatemala women's national team.

International career
Barrios represented Guatemala at two CONCACAF Women's U-20 Championship editions (2010 and 2012). At senior level, she capped during two CONCACAF Women's Championship editions (2010 and 2014), the 2010 Central American and Caribbean Games and the 2012 CONCACAF Women's Olympic Qualifying Tournament (and its qualification).

See also
List of Guatemala women's international footballers

References

1992 births
Living people
Guatemalan women's footballers
Guatemala women's international footballers
Women's association football central defenders
Women's association football midfielders